Han Deok-Hee  (Hangul: 한덕희; born 20 February 1987) is a South Korean former football player who played for Daejeon Citizen as a midfielder.

Club career 
Han was selected by Incheon United as one of their draft players for the 2009 K-League season. Without having played at senior level for Incheon, Han transferred to Daejeon Citizen for the 2011 season.  Han's professional debut was against Seongnam Ilhwa Chunma in a 2011 K-League Cup group match on 20 April 2011, earning a yellow card within minutes of starting the match. Han then made his league debut on 29 May 2011, against Jeonbuk Motors.  Han began to feature regularly in Daejeon's starting line-up in the league, and scored his first professional goal against the Chunnam Dragons on 2 July 2011.

Club career statistics

References

External links 

1987 births
Living people
Association football defenders
South Korean footballers
Incheon United FC players
Daejeon Hana Citizen FC players
Ansan Mugunghwa FC players
K League 1 players
K League 2 players
Association football midfielders
People from Cheonan
Sportspeople from South Chungcheong Province